Waldensian Presbyterian Church is a historic Waldensian church at 104 East Main Street in Valdese, Burke County, North Carolina.

History
In 1893, twenty-nine Waldenses from the Cottian Alps of Italy arrived in Burke County, North Carolina, to pave the way for several hundred other Waldensian immigrants. In 1897, the Waldensians began to construct a Romanesque-style church that would resemble those they left in Italy and France. The building was officially completed in 1899.

It was added to the National Register of Historic Places in 1984. The congregation is a component of the Presbyterian Church (USA).

See also
Waldensian Church and Cemetery of Stone Prairie

References

External links
Official Website

Presbyterian churches in North Carolina
Churches on the National Register of Historic Places in North Carolina
Churches completed in 1896
19th-century Presbyterian church buildings in the United States
Churches in Burke County, North Carolina
Italian-American culture in North Carolina
Waldensianism
National Register of Historic Places in Burke County, North Carolina